The 2019 Wrestling World Cup - Men's freestyle was the first Wrestling World Cup in 2019 which took place in Yakutsk, Sakha Republic, Russia on March 16–17, 2019. This event took place in the main indoor of Triumph Gymnastics Center, which take Russian nationals 2016.

Pool stage

Pool A

Pool B

{| class="wikitable outercollapse"
|-
! POOL B
|-
| Round I

|-
| Round II

|-
| Round III
{| class="wikitable collapsible innercollapse"
!colspan=4|  8 - 2  
|-
!Weight!!United States!!result!!Mongolia
|-
|57 kg||Zane Richards||align=center| 0 –  6 ||Tuvshintulga Tumenbileg
|-
|61 kg||Nicko Megaludis||align=center| 6 – 1 ||Erdenebatyn Bekhbayar
|-
|65 kg||Zain Retherford||align=center| 10 – 0 ||Batmagnai Batchuluun
|-
|70 kg||Jason Chamerlain||align=center| 10 – 0 ||Byambadorj Enkhbayar
|-
|74 kg||Isaiah Martinez||align=center| 11 – 0 ||Bat-Erdene Byambadorj
|-
|79 kg||Thomas Gantt||align=center| 14 – 3 ||Bat-Erdene Byambasuren
|-
|86 kg||Samuel Brooks||align=center| 0 – 6F ||Orgodolyn Üitümen
|-
|92 kg||Hayden Zillmer||align=center| 11 – 0 ||Ulziisaikhan Baasantsogt
|-
|97 kg||Kyven Gadson||align=center| 8 – 0 ||Batzul Ulziisaikhan
|-
|125 kg||Anthony Nelson''||align=center| 9 – 0 ||Lkhagvagerel Munkhtur
|}

|}

Medal Matches
{| class="wikitable outercollapse"
|-
! Medal Matches
|-
| First-Place Match|-

| Third-Place Match'''

Final classement

References 

Wrestling World Cup
Yakutsk
Wrestling World Cup - Men's freestyle
Wrestling World Cup - Men's freestyle